Steven D. Ecker (born April 19, 1961) is an American lawyer and judge who has served as an associate justice of the Connecticut Supreme Court since 2018.

Education 

Ecker received his Bachelor of Arts degree from Yale University, magna cum laude, in 1984, and his Juris Doctor from Harvard Law School, magna cum laude, in 1987. While in law school, Ecker was an editor of the Harvard Law Review from 1985 to 1987, and a member of the winning team in the Ames Moot Court Competition in 1987.

Judicial career

Connecticut superior court service 

He was nominated to a seat on the superior court on March 14, 2014 and confirmed on April 29, 2014.

Connecticut Supreme Court service 

On April 5, 2018 Governor Dannel Malloy nominated Ecker to the Connecticut Supreme Court to fill the vacancy of Richard A. Robinson who was nominated and confirmed as the chief justice.

References

External links
Associate Justice Steven D. Ecker Official Court Biography

Living people
1961 births
20th-century American lawyers
21st-century American judges
Justices of the Connecticut Supreme Court
Harvard Law School alumni
Lawyers from Chicago
Superior court judges in the United States
Yale University alumni